Mitchell River may refer to:

Australia
Mitchell River (Queensland)
Mitchell River (Victoria)
Mitchell River (Western Australia)

Canada
Mitchell River (Cross River)
Mitchell River (Quesnel River tributary)

United States
Mitchell River (Massachusetts)
Mitchell River (North Carolina)

See also 
 Mitchell River National Park (disambiguation)